Hospet also known as Vijayanagara is the largest city and district headquarters of the Vijayanagara district in the Indian state of Karnataka. It is located on the banks of the Tungabhadra River and is 13 km from Hampi. The present day Hampi was the capital of the Vijayanagara Empire. It has been designated a UNESCO World Heritage site. Hosapete is the connecting link between North and South Karnataka.

History

Hosapete city was built in 1520 AD by Krishna Deva Raya, one of the prominent rulers of Vijayanagara Empire. He built the city in honor of his mother Naagalaambika. The city was originally named Naagalapura; however, people referred to the city as Hosa Pete, which means "New City". The area between Hampi and Hosapete is still called Naagalapura. This was the main entrance to the city of Vijayanagara for travellers coming from the west coast.

The current MLA for this area is Anand Singh. The government approved a request to rename the city in October 2014, and Hospet was renamed "Hosapete" on 1 November 2014.

City currently holds the nation's tallest flagpole. During the Independence day on August 15th 2022, Hosapete hoisted the tallest national flag on a 405ft pole.

About

Hosapete is well connected to several important cities in India. Ballari is located approximately 60 km away. Hosapete Junction railway station lies on Hubballi-Guntakal railway line. The nearest airport from the city is Jindal Vidyanagar airport (Bellary airport) approximately 30 km away from Hosapete which serves flights to and from Bangalore and Hyderabad every day. Bangalore is 330 km away. In addition, the city has a well-developed market area. Hosapete is a well-known tourist destination, mainly due to its proximity to Hampi and Tungabhadra Dam.  

The Municipal Ground is good for evening walks, the sports club, occasional exhibitions and is also surrounded by snacks counters.

Demographics

According to the 2011 census, the total population of Hospet was 206,167, of which males are 102,668 and females are 103,499. The town has an average literacy rate of 79.30%, with male literacy at 85.95% and female literacy at 72.74%. In Hospet, 13.46% of the population is under 6 years of age.

References

Cities and towns in Vijayanagara district
Cities in Karnataka